McDaniel is a surname. It may also refer to:

 McDaniel, Maryland, an unincorporated community in the United States
 McDaniel Lake, Missouri
 McDaniel College, Westminster, Maryland
 McDaniel College Budapest, the European campus of McDaniel College

See also
 McDaniels, Georgia, United States, an unincorporated community
 McDaniels, Kentucky, United States, an unincorporated community